Cuesta La Dormida is a mountain in central Chile. Some of the forested mountain area of Cuesta La Dormida has been added to the La Campana National Park in order to achieve protection for the Jubaea and other endangered species. Forests on Cuesta La Dormida provide habitat for a number of bird and mammal species in addition to the flora mosaic itself.

See also
 Cerro La Campana
 Tiltil

References

 John Frederick Eisenberg and Kent Hubbard Redford. 1992. Mammals of the Neotropics: The Southern Cone: Chile, Argentina, Uruguay, Paraguay, University of Chicago Press, . 460 pages
 C. Michael Hogan. 2008. Chilean Wine Palm: Jubaea chilensis, GlobalTwitcher.com, ed. Nicklas Stromberg

Mountains of Chile
Landforms of Valparaíso Region